Uchitani Dam  is a rockfill dam located in Kumamoto Prefecture in Japan. The dam is used for power production. The catchment area of the dam is 2.4 km2. The dam impounds about 31  ha of land when full and can store 5383 thousand cubic meters of water. The construction of the dam was started on 1970 and completed in 1975.

See also
List of dams in Japan

References

Dams in Kumamoto Prefecture